The Sheep Hills are a mountain range in Orange County, California.

See also
Category: Hills of California
Category: Peninsular Ranges
Category: Geography of Orange County, California

References 

Peninsular Ranges
Mountain ranges of Orange County, California